Brian Patrick Fort (born 1966) is a retired United States Navy rear admiral and surface warfare officer who last served as the 35th commander of the United States Naval Forces Japan and commander of Navy Region Japan from July 10, 2019 to July 14, 2021. As CNFJ/CNRJ, Fort was responsible for providing shore readiness to U.S. naval forces in Japan and maritime support to the American forward presence in Japan as well as cooperation with the Japan Maritime Self-Defense Force to promote regional stability and deter aggression.

In March 2021, Carl Lahti, former commandant of Naval District Washington was assigned to succeed Fort as commander of United States Naval Forces Japan and Navy Region Japan. The change of command ceremony took place on July 14, 2021, with Fort retiring from active duty after 32 years of distinguished service.

Early life and education

Raised in Little Rock, Arkansas, Fort received his commission via Officer Candidate School in 1990. He earned a master's degree from the Naval War College in National Security and Strategic Studies and is also a graduate of the Joint Forces Staff College.

USS Fitzgerald collision investigation

The sudden assignment resulted in the cancellation of the planned Navy Region Hawaii change of command ceremony with John V. Fuller, who assumed command forgoing the ceremony.

Awards and decorations

References

Living people
Date of birth missing (living people)
1966 births
People from Little Rock, Arkansas
Military personnel from Arkansas
University of Arkansas alumni
Naval War College alumni
Joint Forces Staff College alumni
Recipients of the Distinguished Service Medal (United States)
Recipients of the Legion of Merit
Recipients of the Order of the Rising Sun, 2nd class
United States Navy rear admirals (lower half)